The Staaten Generaal was a Dutch 74-gun third rate ship of the line which served in the navy of the Dutch Republic and the Batavian Republic.
The order to construct the ship was given by the Admiralty of the Meuse. The ship was commissioned in 1786.

In 1795, the ship was commissioned in the Batavian Navy.

On 11 October 1797 the Staaten Generaal took part in the Battle of Camperdown as the flagship of Vice-Admiral Samuel Story. The fire was extinguished both times, but the Staaten Generaal drifted away from the battle and was unable to continue the fight in a favourable position. On the morning of 12 October she escaped to Texel with the remainder of the Batavian fleet.

In 1798, the ship was renamed to Bato. She sailed to the Cape Colony in 1802, after which she sailed on to Batavia. Upon her return to the Cape, she underwent inspection and was found to be in poor condition, and was turned into a hulked gun platform. She was anchored in Simon's Bay to guard approaches to the naval base. When the Batavians were defeated in the Battle of Blaauwberg, Bato was burned and scuttled to prevent her from being captured.

British Commodore Sir Home Popham, in a letter published in the London Gazette, reported ”French Ship Atalante, of 40 Guns, and Batavian Ship Bato, of 68 Guns: Destroyed by the Enemy running them on Shore when the Cape was attacked, January 10, 1806.”

Post-script
The wreck of the Bato was recently discovered.

References

Ships of the line of the Dutch Republic
Ships of the line of the Batavian Republic
Ships built in the Netherlands
1786 ships
Maritime incidents in 1806
Ship fires
Scuttled vessels
Shipwrecks of South Africa